Leiopsammodius is a genus of aphodiine dung beetles in the family Scarabaeidae. There are more than 40 described species in Leiopsammodius.

Species
These 48 species belong to the genus Leiopsammodius:

 Leiopsammodius abyssinicus (Müller, 1942)
 Leiopsammodius acei Harpootlian, Gordon & Woodruff, 2000
 Leiopsammodius aegialius (Adam, 1986)
 Leiopsammodius balthasari Rakovic, 1995
 Leiopsammodius belloi (Pierotti, 1980)
 Leiopsammodius bolivianus (Cartwright, 1955)
 Leiopsammodius degallieri Rakovic, Mencl & Kral, 2017
 Leiopsammodius desertorum (Fairmaire, 1868)
 Leiopsammodius deyrupi Harpootlian, Gordon & Woodruff, 2000
 Leiopsammodius endroedii Rakovic, 1981
 Leiopsammodius evanidus (Péringuey, 1901)
 Leiopsammodius freyi (Petrovitz, 1961)
 Leiopsammodius gestroi (Clouët, 1900)
 Leiopsammodius globatus (Petrovitz, 1972)
 Leiopsammodius haruspex (Adam, 1980)
 Leiopsammodius horaki Rakovic & Kral, 1996
 Leiopsammodius implicatus (Schmidt, 1925)
 Leiopsammodius indefensus (Schmidt, 1909)
 Leiopsammodius indicus (Harold, 1877)
 Leiopsammodius inflatus (Cartwright, 1955)
 Leiopsammodius japonicus (Harold, 1878)
 Leiopsammodius jelineki (Rakovic, 1977)
 Leiopsammodius kenyensis (Rakovic, 1978)
 Leiopsammodius laevicollis (Klug, 1845)
 Leiopsammodius laevis (Paulian, 1942)
 Leiopsammodius litoralis (Lea, 1923)
 Leiopsammodius liviae (Pittino, 1978)
 Leiopsammodius malindii Rakovic, Mencl & Kral, 2017
 Leiopsammodius malkini (Cartwright, 1946)
 Leiopsammodius manaosi (Cartwright, 1955)
 Leiopsammodius martinezi (Cartwright, 1955)
 Leiopsammodius modestus (Péringuey, 1901)
 Leiopsammodius newcastleensis Stebnicka & Howden, 1996
 Leiopsammodius nomurai Masumoto, 2012
 Leiopsammodius ocmulgeei Harpootlian, Gordon & Woodruff, 2000
 Leiopsammodius pellucens (Petrovitz, 1961)
 Leiopsammodius placidus (Schmidt, 1911)
 Leiopsammodius rakovici Kral, 2017
 Leiopsammodius rufus (Rakovic, 1981)
 Leiopsammodius santaremi (Cartwright, 1955)
 Leiopsammodius scabrifrons (Walker, 1871)
 Leiopsammodius seychellensis (Rakovic, 1979)
 Leiopsammodius soledadei (Petrovitz, 1961)
 Leiopsammodius somalicus (Petrovitz, 1961)
 Leiopsammodius strumae (Chromy, 1983)
 Leiopsammodius subciliatus (Harold, 1869)
 Leiopsammodius substriatus (Balthasar, 1941)
 Leiopsammodius viti (Chalumeau, 1983)

References

Further reading

 
 
 

Scarabaeidae
Articles created by Qbugbot